Kevin Ellison may refer to:

Kevin Ellison (footballer) (born 1979), English footballer
Kevin Ellison (American football) (1987–2018), American football player